Syed Noor (Punjabi) (born Syed Ghulam Mohyuddin Noor) is a Pakistani film director based in Lahore.
In 1970 Syed Noor joined the Pakistani film industry as an assistant to director S. Suleman. Noor assisted S. Suleman for 18 feature films, after which, he penned his first script for the film, "Society Girl" in 1976, which was considered the best film of the year. After the success of his first film, Noor became the prime screenwriting talent in the Pakistani film industry and worked with all the prominent directors of the time.

Syed Noor wrote about 250 films from 1976 to 1992. His written scripts and screenplays were both in Urdu and in Punjabi. As a writer, Noor won many awards in his career, including National Award, Nigaar Award, Graduate Award, Bolan Award, and Asian Award. During his writing career, he was also offered acting opportunities, which he turned down as his ultimate goal was to direct feature films. He had assisted S. Suleman for 5 years with the intention of one day directing his own work.
 
In 1993, Syed Noor made his directorial debut with the movie, "Qasam," which was successful at the box office. During this time, Pakistani cinema was reigned by Punjabi films. Syed Noor began to make films with the intention of reviving Urdu cinema, and his second film "Jeeva" and third film "Sargam" realized his intent. Noor also introduced a number of new actors in his films, who went on to have illustrious careers in the film industry. With the success of Urdu movies, now Punjabi films began to disappear from cinemas, especially after the death of Punjabi film superstar, Sultan Rahi. At this point, Noor announced that he would work on Punjabi films and gave his first Punjabi directorial super hit film, "Choorian," which is still considered one of the most successful films of Pakistani film industry. The vast success of "Choorian" was followed by another film in the Punjabi language, "Majajan," which ran in cinemas for even longer than its predecessor.

With the intent of teaching filmmaking to a new generation, Syed Noor launched Paragon Studios and Paragon Academy of Performing Arts. Partnering with the Mass Communications department of Punjab University, Noor began to teach film as a subject. During this time, multiplex cinemas began to be built in Pakistan and film became digitized, which gave new filmmakers excellent opportunities for new material and projects.

After writing nearly 300 films, directing 55 films, and winning more than 10 National Awards and many other honors, Syed Noor was awarded the highest civilian honor of Pakistan, the "Sitaara-e-Imtiaz" by the Pakistani government.

Filmography

Screenwriter
 Syed Noor was the screenwriter for film director Sangeeta's successful film Society Girl followed by over 250 more films.

Director

Awards and recognition
 Sitara-i-Imtiaz (Star of Excellence) Award by the President of Pakistan in 2013
 Nigar Award for Best Film Director in 1995, 1996 and 1997

Lux Style Awards

See also
 Lists of Pakistani films
 Pakistani films of 2010
 Majajan
 Choorian
 Cinema of Pakistan

References

External links
 Paragon Academy of Performing Arts

1951 births
Living people
Pakistani screenwriters
Pakistani film producers
Recipients of Sitara-i-Imtiaz
Nigar Award winners
Punjabi people
Pakistani Sunni Muslims
Film directors from Lahore
People from Lahore